Ardisia blatteri is a species of plant in the family Primulaceae. It is endemic to India.

References

blatteri
Flora of Kerala
Flora of Tamil Nadu
Endangered plants
Taxonomy articles created by Polbot